Essing is a surname. Notable people with the surname include:

Arthur Essing (1905–1970), German cyclist
Ben Essing (1935–1994), Dutch impresario

See also
De-essing